The Nasu language, also known as the Eastern Yi language or Naisu, Luquan Yi, Wuding Yi, Guizhou Yi, Weining Yi, Guangxi Yi or Longlin Yi, is a Loloish language spoken by the Yi people of China. Nasu and Wusa are two of six Yi languages recognized by the Government of China. There are also some speakers in Vietnam. Unlike most written Yi languages, Nasu uses the Pollard script. A distinct form of the Yi script was traditionally used for Wusa, though few can still read it.

The Nasu language is also known as the Black Yi language, because the Yi people who speak this language are black, but this name is no longer used.

Names
According to the Guizhou Ethnic Gazetteer (2002), Yi autonyms include Nasu 哪苏, Tusu 兔苏, Lagou 腊勾, Guo 果, and so forth.

Most of Yi people of the Luquan area do not have the autonym Luoluo and Nasu (transliterated into Chinese as 纳苏) means "black", hence the Black Yi (黑彝 Hei Yi), though Black Yi is an aristocratic caste distinction among the Yi People, and Black Yi Script (Heiyiwen) was a Latin script for Yi introduced by missionaries.

Classification

Chen (1985)
Chen, et al. (1985:108) recognizes 3 major varieties of Eastern Yi (i.e., Nasu) that are spoken in Yunnan and Guizhou provinces, namely Dianqian 滇黔 (Yunnan-Guizhou), Pan 盘县 (Pan County of Guizhou), and Diandongbei 滇东北 (Northeastern Yunnan).

Dianqian 滇黔次方言: 4 dialects
Shuixi 水西土语: spoken in Bijie, Qianxi, Dafang, Zhijin, Nayong, Qingzhen, and Zhenxiong counties
Wusa 乌撒土语 ( [yig]): spoken in Weining, Shuicheng, Hezhang, Nayong, Yiliang, Huize, and Xuanwei counties
Mangbu 芒部土语: spoken in Zhenxiong and Hezhang counties
Wumeng 乌蒙土语 ( [ywu]): spoken in Zhaotong and Yongshan
Pan 盘县次方言: spoken in Xingren, Pu'an, Qinglong, Shuicheng, Fuyuan, and Luoping counties
Diandongbei 滇东北次方言: 5 dialects
Luquan 武禄土语: spoken in Wuding, Luquan, Yuanmou, Xundian, Lufeng, and Huize counties
Qiaowu 巧武土语 (Qiaojia-Wuding): spoken in Qiaojia, Wuding, Luquan, Yuanmou, and Huize counties
Wuding 武定土语: spoken in Wuding, Yongren, and Lufeng counties
Xundian 寻甸土语: spoken in Xundian, Luquan, Huize, Songming, Luxi, Shizong, Luoping, and Mile counties
Kun'an 昆安土语 (Kunming-Anning): spoken in Anning and Lufeng counties

Huang (1993)
In his description of the Yi script (not the spoken language), Huáng Jiànmíng (1993) holds that the Nasu variety of the Yi script is used by the groups speaking languages of the Nasu language cluster of Northern Yi in south-eastern Sìchuān, eastern Yúnnán, Gùizhōu, as well as in Guǎngxī. He distinguishes two sub-groups. Nasu proper used in Wuding, Luquan, and the suburbs of Kunming, and Wusa used in Guizhou and the bordering areas of Eastern Yunnan.

Bradley (1997)
David Bradley (1997) distinguishes three main dialects of Nasu:

Southeastern (Panxian): 150,000 speakers in southwestern Guizhou
Northeastern (Nesu): 300,000 speakers, comprising most of the other Nasu speakers of Guizhou, and some in extreme northeastern Yunnan and southeastern Sichuan
Shuixi subdialect 水西土语
Wusa subdialect 乌撒土语
Mangbu subdialect 芒部土语
Wumeng subdialect 乌蒙土语
Western (Nasu proper): 250,000 speakers all in north-central Yunnan; Black (more numerous) and Red subdialects

Lama (2012)
Lama (2012) determined that Nasu (Western) is more closely related to Gepo than it is to the others:

Nesu
Panxian (Nasepho): North and South dialects
Shuixi Nesu (Dafang Nesu)
Nesu proper
Wumeng
Mangbu
Wusa (Wusa Nasu)
Nasu
Nasu proper
Gepo: 100,000 speakers

Chen (2010)

Phonology

Consonants 

Vowels 

 Sounds  are heard as syllabic consonants  when following alveolar sounds , and as syllabic retroflex  when following retroflex sounds .
The phonetic sounds of the rhoticized vowels  are mainly heard as more back .

Tones 
3 tones occur as follows:

References

Bibliography
Bradley, David (1997). "Tibeto-Burman languages and classification". In Tibeto-Burman languages of the Himalayas, Papers in South East Asian linguistics. Canberra: Pacific Linguistics.
Chen Kang [陈康]. 2010. A study of Yi dialects [彝语方言研究]. Beijing: China Minzu University Press.
Lama, Ziwo Qiu-Fuyuan (2012), Subgrouping of Nisoic (Yi) Languages, thesis, University of Texas at Arlington.
Lu Lin 卢琳. 2017. Yiyu Shuicheng Zhichanghua yanjiu 彝语水城纸厂话研究. In Guizhou Minzu Yanjiu 贵州民族研究.

External links 
 283-word wordlist in Wuding Maojie Naisu dialect available from Kaipuleohone as well as word lists from other Nasu speakers

Loloish languages
Languages of China